"Man of the House" is a song co-written and recorded by American country music artist Chuck Wicks.  It was released in January 2009 as the third single from the album Starting Now.  The song reached #27 on the Billboard Hot Country Songs chart.  The song was written by Wicks and Michael Mobley.

Chart performance

References 

2009 singles
2008 songs
Chuck Wicks songs
Songs written by Chuck Wicks
Song recordings produced by Dann Huff
RCA Records singles